The lesser yellow bat (Scotophilus borbonicus) is a vesper bat found only on Madagascar and Réunion. On Réunion, it was considered common early in the 19th century, but was last sighted late in the 19th century. Only a single specimen attributed to this species, collected in 1868, is known from Madagascar. It was listed as a critically endangered species in 1996 due to habitat loss, and may be extinct.

References

Bats of Africa
Fauna of Rodrigues
Mammals of Réunion
Mammals of Madagascar
Scotophilus
Mammals described in 1803
Taxa named by Étienne Geoffroy Saint-Hilaire